Susan M. Baer (August 25, 1950 – August 9, 2016) was an American public servant who achieved several notable firsts. She was the first person to run all three major New York City airports and, in turn, the first woman to manage each of them. She was also the first female aviation director of the Port Authority of New York and New Jersey; and the first woman to manage the Lincoln Tunnel.

Baer was born in Allentown, Pennsylvania, on August 25, 1950. She obtained a BA in urban studies and anthropology from Barnard College in 1972 and an MA in business from New York University.

Baer began working for the Port Authority as a management analyst in 1976 and eventually managed LaGuardia Airport (1994–1998), Newark Liberty International Airport (–2007), and John F. Kennedy International Airport (–2008). She was appointed the authority's aviation director in 2009 by Christopher O. Ward.

In 2013, she joined Arup. Arup promoted her to the role of "Global Aviation Business Leader" in February 2016. She was also Vice Chair of the Board of Trustees of Vaughn College.

She died on August 9, 2016, from cancer, and was survived by her husband, Joseph Martella and their three children.

References

External links 

 Port Authority obituary

1950 births
2016 deaths
Vaughn College people
Port Authority of New York and New Jersey people
Barnard College alumni
New York University alumni
People from Allentown, Pennsylvania